Bahdo or Baxdo is a district in the Galguduud region of Galmudug state in central Somalia.

References

Populated places in Galguduud